Michael T. Mason (born March 18, 1974) is a former competition breaststroke swimmer, who was born in the United States, but represented Canada in international competition.  He competed for Canada at the 1992 Summer Olympics in Barcelona, Spain, and finished in 23rd position in the men's 200-metre breaststroke.

References
 Canadian Olympic Committee

1974 births
Living people
Canadian male breaststroke swimmers
Olympic swimmers of Canada
People from Delaware, Ohio
Swimmers at the 1992 Summer Olympics